Raveniola is a genus of spiders in the family Nemesiidae, first described in 1987 by Zonstein.

Species
, it contains 43 species widely distributed in Asia:

 Raveniola adjarica Zonstein, Kunt & Yağmur, 2018 — Georgia
 Raveniola alpina Li & Zonstein, 2015 — China
 Raveniola ambardzumyani Marusik & Zonstein, 2021 — Armenia
 Raveniola anadolu Zonstein, Kunt & Yağmur, 2018 — Turkey
 Raveniola arthuri Kunt & Yağmur, 2010 — Turkey
 Raveniola beelzebub Lin & Li, 2020 — China
 Raveniola bellula Li & Zonstein, 2015 — China
 Raveniola birecikensis Zonstein, Kunt & Yağmur, 2018 — Turkey
 Raveniola caudata Zonstein, 2009 — Tajikistan
 Raveniola chayi Li & Zonstein, 2015 — China
 Raveniola concolor Zonstein, 2000 — Pakistan
 Raveniola dunini Zonstein, Kunt & Yağmur, 2018 — Armenia, Azerbaijan, Iran
 Raveniola fedotovi (Charitonov, 1946) — Central Asia
 Raveniola ferghanensis (Zonstein, 1984) — Kyrgyzstan
 Raveniola gracilis Li & Zonstein, 2015 — China
 Raveniola guangxi (Raven & Schwendinger, 1995) — China
 Raveniola hebeinica Zhu, Zhang & Zhang, 1999 — China
 Raveniola hyrcanica Dunin, 1988 — Azerbaijan
 Raveniola jundai (Lin & Li, 2022) — China
 Raveniola kopetdaghensis (Fet, 1984) — Turkmenistan
 Raveniola lamia Yu & Zhang, 2021 — China
 Raveniola marusiki Zonstein, Kunt & Yağmur, 2018 — Iran
 Raveniola mazandaranica Marusik, Zamani & Mirshamsi, 2014 — Iran
 Raveniola micropa (Ausserer, 1871) — Turkey
 Raveniola mikhailovi Zonstein, 2021 — Kyrgyzstan
 Raveniola montana Zonstein & Marusik, 2012 — China
 Raveniola nana Zonstein, Kunt & Yağmur, 2018 — Turkey
 Raveniola niedermeyeri (Brignoli, 1972) — Iran
 Raveniola pontica (Spassky, 1937) — Russia (Caucasus), Georgia
 Raveniola redikorzevi (Spassky, 1937) — Turkmenistan
 Raveniola rugosa Li & Zonstein, 2015 — China
 Raveniola shangrila Zonstein & Marusik, 2012 — China
 Raveniola sinani Zonstein, Kunt & Yağmur, 2018 — Turkey
 Raveniola songi Zonstein & Marusik, 2012 — China
 Raveniola spirula Li & Zonstein, 2015 — China
 Raveniola turcica Zonstein, Kunt & Yağmur, 2018 — Turkey
 Raveniola virgata (Simon, 1891) (type) — Central Asia
 Raveniola vonwicki Zonstein, 2000 — Iran
 Raveniola xizangensiss (Hu & Li, 1987) — China
 Raveniola yajiangensis Li & Zonstein, 2015 — China
 Raveniola yangren (Lin & Li, 2022) — China
 Raveniola yunnanensis Zonstein & Marusik, 2012 — China
 Raveniola zaitzevi (Charitonov, 1948) — Azerbaijan, Georgia

References

Nemesiidae
Mygalomorphae genera
Spiders of Asia